The 2009 Deutsche Tourenwagen Masters was the twenty-third season of premier German touring car championship and also tenth season under the moniker of Deutsche Tourenwagen Masters since the series' resumption in 2000. The series began on 17 May at Hockenheim and finished on 25 October at the same venue.

Timo Scheider successfully defended his championship title, taking his Audi A4 to a five-point series win over Mercedes-Benz driver Gary Paffett.

Teams and drivers
Of the nineteen drivers that competed in the 2008 season, only Bernd Schneider and Christijan Albers did not return. Rookies in 2009 are the Kolles Futurecom trio of Christian Bakkerud, Johannes Seidlitz and Tomáš Kostka. The following manufacturers, teams and drivers competed in the 2009 Deutsche Tourenwagen Masters. All teams competed with tyres supplied by Dunlop.

Driver changes
Katherine Legge moved from the Futurecom-TME team to a team created for her at Audi Sport Team Abt Lady Power, gaining a later model Audi with the change.

Christian Bakkerud joined the series coming from GP2 Series along with Formula Renault BARC driver Johannes Seidlitz both joining the Colin Kolles owned Futurecom-TME team with Czech Touring Car Championship racer Tomáš Kostka joining sister-team Futurecom-BRT.

Christijan Albers left DTM to pursue sports car racing with Kolles' Le Mans Series team and the most successful driver in the history of DTM, four-time champion Bernd Schneider retired from the sport.

Technical changes
The series adopted new rule changes, as announced on 21 April 2009. Qualifying consisted of four sessions, rather than two in 2008. The minimum weights of the cars were also altered, with 2009 cars topping the scales at 1050 kg, 2008 cars at 1030 kg and 2007 machinery at 1010 kg.

Race calendar and results
To avoid a clash of coverage times with the 2009 Bahrain Grand Prix, the season opener traditionally held at Hockenheim took place on 17 May, three weeks later than originally planned. Consequently, the EuroSpeedway round that had been scheduled for this date was moved to 31 May. The Brands Hatch round was also moved back a week due to the 2009 Belgian Grand Prix, from 30 August to 6 September.

French circuit Dijon-Prenois made its maiden appearance on the DTM calendar holding the penultimate round of the season on 11 October. Italian circuit Mugello was dropped from the calendar.

Season results
Timo Scheider won his second DTM series crown for Audi team Abt Sportsline. With season long rival, Mercedes-Benz driver Gary Paffett taking four wins through the season, and with Scheider disqualified from the results at Zandvoort mid-season, left Scheider behind Paffett for much of the season. Schieder finished first or second in all bar one event for the remainder of the season after Zandvoort including victories at Oschersleben and Catalunya in an irresistible charge to the title. By the time Paffett returned to the podium with wins in the last two races of the year Scheider had built a points buffer large enough to secure the title.

Paul di Resta stood on the podium three times in the final four races, including a win at Brands Hatch to emerge from the pack in third place in the series pointscore, four points ahead of Bruno Spengler and Mattias Ekström. Apart from Scheider, Paffett and di Resta, race wins were taken by Tom Kristensen at the Hockenheim season opener, his last ever touring car victory before semi-retirement; Jamie Green at the Norisring street circuit and by Martin Tomczyk at the Nürburgring.

The combined efforts of Paffett and Spengler saw the HWA run Salzgitter / Mercedes-Benz Bank team claim the teams prize at season's end, 100 points to 85 points of the Abt Sportsline team of Scheider and Kristensen.

Championship standings

Drivers' championship

† — Driver retired, but was classified as they completed 90% of the winner's race distance.

Teams' championship

References

External links
 The official website of the Deutsche Tourenwagen Masters

Deutsche Tourenwagen Masters seasons
Deutsche Tourenwagen Masters